Chuncheon Songam Sports Town is a sports complex in Chuncheon, South Korea. The former stadium was built in 1980 as Chuncheon Civic Stadium.

Facilities

Chuncheon Songam Stadium 
Newly established main stadium was opened in May 2009. It is used mostly for football matches. The stadium has a capacity for 20,000 spectators. It is home ground of Gangwon FC since June 2009.

See also 
 Chuncheon Civic Stadium

External links
 Chuncheon Songam Leports Town at World Stadiums

Football venues in South Korea
Gangwon FC
Sports complexes in South Korea
Chuncheon
Sports venues in Gangwon Province, South Korea
Sports venues completed in 2009
K League 1 stadiums
2009 establishments in South Korea